Waterloo Township is a township in Lyon County, Kansas, United States.

History
Waterloo Township was originally called Kanzas Center Township [sic], and under the latter name was established in 1857. It was renamed Waterloo Township in 1859.

References

Townships in Lyon County, Kansas
Townships in Kansas
1857 establishments in Kansas Territory